William Nethercoat  was an Anglican priest in Ireland.

Nethrcoat was educated at Trinity College Dublin. He was the incumbent at Beagh then Dean of Kilmacduagh from 1753 until his death in 1771.

References

Alumni of Trinity College Dublin
Deans of Kilmacduagh
18th-century Irish Anglican priests
1771 deaths